Jin Sun-mee (born 14 May 1967) is a South Korean politician previously served as the Minister of Gender Equality and Family under President Moon Jae-in. She is also a three-term parliamentarian previously via proportional representation and now representing the district that was dictated by male politicians and opposition parties.

Before entering politics she worked for the rights of the marginalised people as an attorney at law. She was one of lawyers leading the case for the repeal of the patriarchal Hoju (family head) system.

After becoming a member of the National Assembly, one of her main legislative agendas was on reforming law enforcement agencies and national intelligence service - preventing them from violating civil rights of citizens. She was a spokesperson of the first presidential campaign of current President Moon Jae-in in 2012. She became widely known when she filibustered for nine hours against controversial anti-terror bill in February 2016. Before appointed to the minister, she was the first female senior deputy floor leader of a ruling party.

In 2020 Jin was elected as the chair of National Assembly's Land, Infrastructure and Transport Committee responsible for scrutinising Ministry of Land, Infrastructure and Transport, Korail and related agencies. It is also the most populous and popular committee at the National Assembly as its members have direct influence on assigning budget to local SOC projects. From November 2020 Jin is leading her party's task force to review housing policies including establishing new ministry dedicating in public housing.

Electoral history

Personal life 
She completed primary and secondary education in her hometown of Sunchang, Jeollabuk-do. She is the most heavily indebted member of the Cabinet and her party due to her husband's debt.

References

External links 

Minister of Gender Equality and Family

Living people
Minjoo Party of Korea politicians
Government ministers of South Korea
Women government ministers of South Korea
1967 births
People from North Jeolla Province
Sungkyunkwan University alumni
20th-century South Korean lawyers
South Korean women lawyers
Members of the National Assembly (South Korea)
South Korean women's rights activists
21st-century South Korean lawyers
Female members of the National Assembly (South Korea)